Ada Vorhaus Gabriel (July 28, 1898 – 1975) was an American female Mid-century modern painter and lithographer. She studied at Barnard College, the New York School of Design, with Erich Gletter in Munich, and with Emil Ganso in New York. Her work is featured in the collections of The National Gallery of Art, Yale University Art Gallery, Fogg Museum, and Indianapolis Museum of Art.

References

External links 

1898 births
1975 deaths
American women printmakers
American women painters
20th-century American women artists
20th-century American printmakers